This is a list of bagpipe makers. It covers both family-based and commercial outfits from the 17th century to the present era. In the 1950s, the bagpipe traditions of Europe were revived. The market is increasing in size as the popularity of the instrument is increasing, and the list of bagpipe makers is rising.

British Isles pipes

Great Highland Bagpipes/Great Irish Warpipes

Uilleann pipes

Scottish smallpipes and borderpipes

Northumbrian pipes

Lincolnshire bagpipes

Cornish bagpipes

Shuttle pipes

Continental European pipes

Armenian bagpipes

Estonian bagpipes (torupill)

French and German pipes

Greek Bagpipes

Swedish bagpipes (säckpipa)

Sources

Bibliography

News articles

Online resources

References

 
Bagpipe makers